Gaymer may refer to:
Gaymer, a term for LGBT video game players.
Gaymer Cider Company, a beverage producer.